Henry Schein, Inc. is an American distributor of health care products and services with a presence in 32 countries. The company is a Fortune World's Most Admired Company and is ranked number one in its industry for social responsibility by Fortune magazine. Henry Schein has been recognized by the Ethisphere Institute as the World's Most Ethical Company six times as of 2017.

History 
In 1932, Henry Schein, a graduate of Columbia University College of Pharmacy, borrowed $500 and opened a pharmacy in Queens, New York. The company expanded into dental supplies in the 1960s, and by the late 1980s, Henry Schein held approximately 10 percent of the dental-supply market. Marvin Schein, Henry Schein's son, took over management of daily operations in 1971.

In 1978, founder Henry Schein's son Jay Schein became CEO of the company. When Jay Schein died of cancer in 1989, Stanley Bergman took over as CEO. Bergman was born in South Africa and came to New York in 1976, where he became an accountant. In 1980, he joined Henry Schein and was promoted to CFO.

Henry Schein Inc. filed with the U.S. Securities and Exchange Commission in 1995 to sell 6.2 million shares in an initial public offering with William Blair & Company as the lead underwriter. The IPO raised $72.8 million and began trading on the Nasdaq. By 1996, the company was up to $1.4 billion in sales and $29 million in profit under Bergman's leadership. That year, the company made seventeen acquisitions.

In August 1997, Henry Schein Inc. agreed to buy Sullivan Dental Products Inc. for approximately $318 million. The purchase made the company the world's largest distributor of dental equipment and supplies. By that point, Henry Schein had made 16 acquisitions in 1997. Also in 1997, Henry Schein acquired New York-based medical-products distributor Micro BioMedics Inc as well as Dentrix Dental Systems.

Henry Schein announced the acquisition of demedis GmbH and Euro Dental Holding GmbH in June 2004. In November 2009, it was announced that Henry Schein Inc. and Butler Animal Health Supply would be launching joint venture Butler Schein Animal Health, the largest veterinary sales and distribution company in the United States. Butler Schein Animal Health was rebranded as Henry Schein Animal Health in 2013. Between 1989 and 2016, Henry Schein purchased approximately 200 companies. The company's chief executive officer, Stanley Bergman, was announced as Chief Executive Magazine's CEO of the Year in May 2017.

In 2018, the FTC accused Benco Dental, Patterson Companies, and Henry Schein of violating antitrust laws. In October 2019, the FTC’s Chief Administrative Law Judge dismissed the claims against Henry Schein while finding that Benco and Patterson violated U.S. antitrust laws.

In February 2019, Henry Schein spun off the company's animal health business and merged it with Vets First Choice to form a new company. The new company is established as Covetrus.

Henry Schein Inc. was one of the six main defendants in lawsuits with state and local governments of the opioid epidemic in the United States. The company was dismissed as a defendant in October 2019 in the bellwether Summit County, Ohio litigation.

In May 2022, Henry Schein announced a donation of $200,000 in health care products to the Howard University of Dentistry and Meharry Medical College of Dentistry in order to Support their efforts to provide free oral health to the underserved through their student outreach programs.

In July 2022, Henry Schein acquired Condor Dental, a dental distribution company.

Operations

Dental
In 1997, Henry Schein acquired Sullivan Dental Products and Dentrix Dental Systems, making it the world's largest distributor of dental equipment and supplies. Dentrix Ascend, Henry Schein's cloud-based software designed for dental offices, is a scalable system. Its interface was built to be intuitive and the company works with users to include features dental offices require.

Henry Schein established the Henry Schein Dental Business Institute in March 2015 to teach owners and operators of dental practices the fundamentals of business. The first class to complete the program graduated in March 2016. Henry Schein also launched the Henry Schein Digital Dentistry Program at Temple University's Maurice H. Kornberg School of Dentistry in 2016.

In May 2016, Henry Schein's entity Dentrix presented the DEXIS software's ability to integrate X-rays into a patient's chart. Zahn Dental, Henry Schein's laboratory supply business, acquired Custom Automated Prosthetics in June 2016. The acquisition enabled Henry Schein to expand its prosthetic offerings.

In the UK, Henry Schein owns Kent Express dental supplies, a mail order supplier of dental products and small equipment.

Medical
In November 2014, Henry Schein Medical announced a strategic arrangement with Cardinal Health. Cardinal Health's physician office-sales organization consolidated into Henry Schein Medical.

Former division

Animal health
Henry Schein has spun off this division in early 2019 produces software that is used in veterinary practices designed to improve communication and data management including the online cloud-based application, Rapport. In February 2016, Henry Schein released Axis-Q, a software application designed to ease the recording and access of veterinary medical records.

See also 

 Dentrix
 SmartPak (60% Ownership)
 Henry Schein, Inc. v. Archer & White Sales, Inc.

References

External links
 

Health care companies established in 1932
Dental companies
Dental companies of the United States
Companies based in Suffolk County, New York
1932 establishments in New York City
Health care companies based in New York (state)
Medical technology companies of the United States
1995 initial public offerings
Companies listed on the Nasdaq
1932 establishments in the United States
American companies established in 1932